Stoyan Grigorov is a Bulgarian footballer who plays as a midfielder.

References

External links

Profile at lportala.net

Living people
1997 births
Bulgarian footballers
First Professional Football League (Bulgaria) players
PFC Lokomotiv Plovdiv players
Association football midfielders